Cecilia Molinari (born 22 November 1949 in Borgo Val di Taro) is a former Italian sprinter.

Biography
Cecilia Molinari participated at one edition of the Summer Olympics (1972), she has 36 caps in national team from 1966 to 1976. She also participated at two editions of European Championships.

Achievements

National titles
Cecilia Molinari has won ten times the individual national championship.
6 wins on 100 metres (1968, 1970, 1971, 1972, 1973, 1974)
4 wins on 60 metres indoor (1970, 1971, 1972, 1973)

See also
 Italy national relay team

References

External links
 

1949 births
Sportspeople from the Province of Parma
Italian female sprinters
Athletes (track and field) at the 1972 Summer Olympics
Olympic athletes of Italy
Living people
Mediterranean Games gold medalists for Italy
Mediterranean Games bronze medalists for Italy
Athletes (track and field) at the 1971 Mediterranean Games
Athletes (track and field) at the 1975 Mediterranean Games
Mediterranean Games medalists in athletics
Olympic female sprinters
20th-century Italian women
21st-century Italian women